Cristina Bucșa was the defending champion but chose to participate in Budapest instead.

Rebeka Masarova won the title, defeating Ane Mintegi del Olmo in the final, 7–6(7–3), 6–4.

Seeds

Draw

Finals

Top half

Bottom half

References 

 Main Draw

Open Araba en Femenino - Singles